The 2012–13 Aruban Division di Honor is the 52nd season of top flight association football in Aruba. The season began on 12 October 2012. RCA were the defending champions, having won their 13th title last season.

Teams 
Juventud TL finished in 10th place at the end of the Regular Stage of last season's competition and were relegated to the Aruban Division Uno. Taking their place were the champions of the Division Uno, Caiquetio.

River Plate and Caravel finished in 8th and 9th place after the Regular Stage last season and had to play against the 2nd and 3rd place teams from the Division Uno.  River Plate and Sporting finished in the top two spots at the end of this playoff and earned their places in the competition for 2012–13, but Sporting withdrew early in the season, leaving 9 teams in the top division.

Club information

Regular stage 
The 9 teams in the competition play against every other team in the league twice in this stage of the competition, once at home and once away, for a total of 16 matches each. The top six teams progress to the Calle 6, where they play each other once each.  The top four teams progress to the Playoff Stage.

Table

Results

Calle 6 
The top six teams at the end of the Regular Stage enter this competition.  Points from the regular stage are retained, and each team plays against the other five teams once.  The top four qualify for the Playoff Stage

Standings

Results

Playoff stage 
The top four teams at the end of the Calle 6 enter this competition (known as the AVB Subway Cup 2013 for sponsorship purposes). Each team plays against the other three twice each, once at home and once away, for a total of six matches each. The top two teams qualify for the Final Stage.

Standings

Final stage 

Champions: La Fama

Promotion/relegation playoff 
The 8th and 9th place teams after the Regular Stage is finished enter this competition, along with the 2nd and 3rd place teams from the Division Uno. After six rounds, the top two teams will earn a place in next season's competition.

References

External links 
Division di Honor via AFF
Aruba National League via FIFA.com

Aruban Division di Honor seasons
Aruba
foot
foot